Shahrizor Eyalet was a semi-independent eyalet of the Ottoman Empire covering the area of present-day Iraqi Kurdistan.

History
When the Ottomans conquered the region in 1554, they decided to leave the government of the region to Kurdish leaders, so it was not incorporated directly into the Ottoman administrative system. The governors were members of Kurdish clans, and only rarely were there Ottoman garrisons in the province.

In the 18th and 19th centuries, the eyalet came to be dominated by the Baban clan. The members of this clan were able to maintain their rule by guaranteeing the security of the Ottoman Empire's volatile border with Iran in exchange of almost full autonomy. The sanjak of Baban, which included the town of Kirkuk, was named after the family.

The Baban considered the Kurdish princes of Ardalan, who controlled the Iranian portions of Kurdistan, to be their natural rivals, and in 1694 Sulayman Beg invaded Iran and defeated the mir of Ardalan. After 1784, the Babans moved their capital to the new town of Sulaymaniya, which was named after the dynasty's founder.

In 1850 the rule of the Babans was finally brought to an end, and the region was placed under the direct control of the governor of Baghdad in 1862. However, the fall of the Babans led to a deterioration of the relations between the clans, and the resulting anarchy was only ended with the rise of another Kurdish clan, the Barzinji, in the early 20th century.

Administrative divisions
Sanjaks of Sharazor Eyalet in the 17th century:

 Sarujek
 Erbil
 Kesnan
 Sheher-bazar
 Jenguleh
 Jebel-hamrin
 Hazar-mardud
 Alhuran
 Merkareh
 Hazir
 Rudin
 Tiltari
 Sebeh
 Zenjir
 Ajub
 Abrumaz
 Pak
 Perteli
 Bilkas
 Aushni
 Kala-Ghazi
 Sheherzul

References

Ottoman Iraq
Eyalets of the Ottoman Empire in Asia
History of Sulaymaniyah Governorate
1554 establishments in the Ottoman Empire
1862 disestablishments in the Ottoman Empire
1554 establishments in Asia
1862 disestablishments in Asia